Samuel Alito served his 10th year on the United States Court of Appeals for the Third Circuit in 1999. The following is a partial list of opinions written by Judge Alito in 1999.

References

Case law lists by judge